Chiloglanis lamottei is a species of upside-down catfish native to Guinea, where it is found at Mount Nimba, and Côte d'Ivoire, where it occurs in the Cavally River.  This species grows to a length of  SL.

References

External links 

lamottei
Catfish of Africa
Freshwater fish of West Africa
Fish described in 1948